Distant Voices may refer to:

Books
Distant Voices, by Barbara Erskine 1996
Distant Voices, by  John Pilger 1994

Film and TV
 Distant Voices, Still Lives (1988), a 1988 British film
 "Distant Voices" (Star Trek: Deep Space Nine)
 "Distant voices", an episode of Connections, BBC 1978

Music

Albums

Distant Voices, album by Steve Lacy, 1975
Distant Voices, album by Trisomie 21, 1992
The Distant Voices EP, by Lost Tribe, 1997

Songs
"Distant Voices", a song by John Norum from Face the Truth, 1992
"Distant Voices", a song by German heavy metal band Rage from Secrets in a Weird World, 1989
"Distant Voices", a song by British band Bush from Razorblade Suitcase, 1996
"Distant Voices", a song by Kaipa from Keyholder, 2003
"Distant Voices", a song by The Farm from Hullabaloo, 1994
"Distant Voices", a song by Shadowfax from Shadowdance, 1983
 "A Distant Voice", a song by Sonny Simmons from Staying on the Watch, 1966